Pomarico is a small town of 4500 inhabitants in Southern Italy, in the region Basilicata.
  
The town was founded about 850 AD by the Byzantines. An old castle was built but only few ruins of it remain.

Main sights
The Marquess Palace, built in the 18th century, and still standing in the centre of the town.
The Main Church dedicated to St. Michael, also built in that period. It has a Baroque façade and contains a wooden statue of St. Michael (1400), as well as paintings of Pietro Antonio Ferro and Andrea Vaccaro.
The church of St. Anthony of Padua (18th century). It lies by a former convent, now used as the city hall.

People
Niccolò Fiorentino (lawyer and patriot during the Neapolitan Revolution)

References

External links
Official website 

Cities and towns in Basilicata
Populated places established in the 9th century BC